Jaan Leppik may refer to:
 Sakarias Jaan Leppik (born 1969), Estonian clergyman and politician 
  (1861–1943), Estonian writer